Pristimantis diadematus is a species of frog in the family Strabomantidae.
It is found in Ecuador and Peru, and possibly Brazil and Colombia.
Its natural habitat is tropical moist lowland forest.

References

diadematus
Amphibians of Ecuador
Amphibians of Peru
Taxa named by Marcos Jiménez de la Espada
Amphibians described in 1875
Taxonomy articles created by Polbot